Kolynos is a line of oral care products created by Newell Sill Jenkins in 1908 and acquired by Colgate-Palmolive in 1995. The name is a combination of two Greek words, meaning "beautifier" and "disease preventer".

The  products were popular in the 1930s and 40s, and sponsored several well-known radio programs, including Mr. Keen, Tracer of Lost Persons.

Although not now readily available in the US, the brand remains strong in Latin America, and also manufactured in Hungary, Slovenia (Henkel). In Brazil, Kolynos was the second best- selling product, after Colgate itself. Because of antitrust concerns at the time of the acquisition, Colgate-Palmolive agreed to suspend marketing Kolynos-branded toothpaste in Brazil for a number of years, but Colgate-Palmolive shortly began selling what was essentially the same product, with very similar packaging and marketing, under a new brand called Sorriso ("Smile" in Portuguese), successfully transferring most of the customer loyalty to the new line of toothpaste.  Kolynos jingles have been written in several languages. In Peru, Kolynos is synonymous with toothpaste and a big smile can be called a Kolynos smile.

In popular culture
The Kolynos brand is mentioned in a passage in The Catcher in the Rye (1951) by J. D. Salinger:

In the novel Midnight's Children by Salman Rushdie there is a chapter titled "The Kolynos Kid".

The brand is also mentioned in The Black Gang by Herman Cyril McNeile:

It also finds a mention in Vikram Seth's celebrated novel A Suitable Boy:

See also

List of toothpaste brands
Index of oral health and dental articles
 List of defunct consumer brands

References

Brands of toothpaste
Colgate-Palmolive brands
Defunct companies of Brazil
Products introduced in 1908